RESON A/S is a Danish company which provides tools for underwater acoustic applications and survey accuracy requirements.

Range of products covers digital multi-beam systems, single-beam sensors, 3D visualization software, high-power transducers, and precision reference hydrophones. The products are used by, among others, the oil and gas industries, marine researchers and naval surveillance teams.

RESON is the holding company of the RESON Group. Headquartered in Denmark, RESON has subsidiaries in the US, Singapore, UK, Germany, and the Netherlands. In addition to these subsidiaries, there are RESON representatives located in 25 countries.

History 
In 1976, the three brothers, Jens, Claus, and Per Resen Steenstrup pooled their expertise in advanced ultrasonic technology, and consequently RESON A/S was born. At first, they focused on developing homogenisers, but before long their passion for the sea won through. In the 1980s, RESON produced the first transducers and hydrophones, and meanwhile the company opened its first subsidiary, RESON Inc., in California. However in 2006, a group of professional institutional investors assumed ownership of RESON by buying the three brothers out.

During the 2011 Danish parliamentary election, then Prime Minister Lars Løkke Rasmussen from the Danish Liberal Party visited the RESON headquarters in Slangerup as part of his election campaign.

SeaBat 
RESON’s sonars are called SeaBats and the first SeaBat was installed on an ROV at the beginning of the 1990s. After that, the SeaBat 8101 took multibeam surveys down to 3,000 metres, while the SeaBats 8125 and 8160 made dynamically focused beams available to commercial surveyors for the first time.
In 2001, RESON launched the SeaBat 8150 which was the first multibeam echosounder to cover the entire water column. Soon afterwards, RESON acquired Navitronic Systems, expanding the company portfolio with a range of singlebeam echosounders, sound velocity probes, and hydrographic software. RESON's SeaBat sonars were used to map deep ocean troughs off international waters and were used in the 2004 Greek Olympics to detect divers for underwater surveillance.

References

External links
 

Technology companies of Denmark
Companies based in Frederikssund Municipality